State highways in North Carolina are owned and maintained by the U.S. state of North Carolina, through the North Carolina Department of Transportation (NCDOT).


List of primary routes 

When originally established in the 1920s, the state highway system was highly organized: two-digit routes ending in "0" were major cross-state routes, other two digit routes were numbered as spurs off of the main route (that is, Highway 54 would have been a spur off of Highway 50) and lesser important routes were given three digit numbers by appending an extra "ones" digit to the two digit route it branched off of (that is, Highway 541 would have been itself a spur off of Highway 54).

Since its establishment, there have been countless small changes to the state highway numbering system as routes are eliminated, combined, or renumbered.  There have been four events that have forced large numbers of routes to be changed:  1933–1934 elimination of duplicate and renumbering of state routes along or that share with U.S. Routes, 1937 renumbering for contiguous routes with South Carolina, 1940 renumbering for contiguous routes with Virginia and 1961 renumbering of routes that share with Interstate highways in the state.  Because of these renumbering events, the original numbering system has been largely obscured.

List of alternate routes 

North Carolina alternate routes have been utilized in a multitude of ways, including business, bypass, cut-thru and spurs.  After 1960, nearly all have been decommissioned or converted to business loops, and establishing new alternate routes have been prohibited.  Today, only three alternate routes are currently active in the state.

List of business loops 

North Carolina business routes were first established in 1960 with the conversation of some alternate routes.  All business routes in the state are set up as a loop, meaning it will separate then converge back to the main highway.  Typically, they serve to connect downtown areas in cities and towns in the state.

List of other special routes 

North Carolina, on rare occasion, will utilize other uniquely special routes in the state.  Listed here are bypass, connector, divided and spur routes.

See also

References

External links 
 North Carolina Department of Transportation
 NCRoads.com Annex: More Highways of North Carolina

Highways in
State highways in North Carolina